Jim George may refer to:

Jim George (footballer) (active 1970s and 1980s), Scottish football player and manager
Jim George (rugby union) for Falmouth RFC
Jim George (weightlifter) (born 1935), American Olympic weightlifter
Jim George (author) (born 1943), American author

See also
Jimmy George (disambiguation)
James George (disambiguation)